The Nassau County Soil and Water Conservation District (SWCD), located in Nassau County, Florida is a government entity dedicated to encouraging productive use of land, water and air resources in the county. According to a summary taken from Florida Statutes Ch. 582, the Board's powers include conducting surveys, investigations, research and demonstrational projects relating to soil and water conservation (in areas like irrigation, water quality, and soil erosion).

District supervisors 
SWCD supervisors do not receive monetary compensation, and, for the most part, conduct their activities on their own time.  Supervisors are members of a five-person board for the district, to which they can either be elected or appointed.  

The current district supervisors are:
Group 1 - Dean Woehrle (Chairman)
Group 2 - Matthew Bellar
Group 3 - Justin Wentz
Group 4 - Joe Johnson  
Group 5 - Daniel Caswell

External links 
National Association of Conservation Districts
Nassau County, Florida's listing of currently elected officials

Nassau County, Florida
Special districts of Florida